Fisher Branch Airport  is located  east of Fisher Branch, Manitoba, Canada.

References

Registered aerodromes in Manitoba